Emmanuel François Iguiniz (9 December 1889 – 20 September 1914) was a rugby union player, who represented  in one match. He was killed in action in the First World War. 

His only appearance for France was on 13 April 1914 against  at Colombes, Paris, France. The English, led by Ronnie Palmer won the game 13–39, Palmer contributing four tries. It was the last international game of rugby played in Europe before the start of the First World War.

References

Bibliography

1889 births
1914 deaths
French rugby union players
French military personnel killed in World War I
France international rugby union players